is a scrolling shooter, part of the Fantasy Zone series. It was released for the Sega Mega Drive in Europe and Japan. A Virtual Console version was released July, 2008, making its debut in North America. It is included in the Sega Genesis Mini, and was re-released on the Nintendo Switch Online + Expansion Pack.

The game is a free moving shoot 'em up, like its side-scrolling predecessors, and essentially has the same core gameplay as the arcade original.

The soundtrack to the game was composed by Naoki Kodaka, and  features themes from the original Fantasy Zone game composed by Hiroshi Kawaguchi.

Plot
The game follows Opa-Opa as he fights to avenge the death of his father, O-papa, who was killed defending the Fantasy Zone against the invading Dark Menon. Opa-Opa must rid the Fantasy Zone of the minions of the Dark Menon and restore peace.

Gameplay
Opa-Opa must clear the levels by moving through them and shooting down all of the Enemy Generators. Once every Enemy Generator in the level has been destroyed a Menon Guardian will appear. These are essentially the bosses of each level. In order to obtain better weapons/equipment, etc., the player needs to collect gold. Gold coins can be collected when an enemy is destroyed. Vast amounts of Gold will also be given when Menon Guardians are defeated.

External links

References

Fantasy Zone (series)
1992 video games
Shoot 'em ups
Cute 'em ups
Nintendo Switch Online games
Scrolling shooters
Sega Genesis games
Sunsoft games
Video games scored by Naoki Kodaka
Virtual Console games
Sega video games
Single-player video games
Video games developed in Japan